The Ron Coote Cup is a rugby league match contested annually in the National Rugby League between the South Sydney Rabbitohs and the Sydney Roosters. The Ron Coote Cup was introduced in 2007 in the name of Ron Coote who played with distinction for both clubs.

Head To Head

Results

See also

 Rivalries in the National Rugby League

References

External links

Sydney Roosters
South Sydney Rabbitohs
Rugby league competitions in New South Wales
Rugby league in Sydney
Rugby league rivalries
2007 establishments in Australia
Recurring sporting events established in 2007
Sports rivalries in Australia